Autostop may refer to:
Hitchhiking
"Autostop" (Anna Vissi and The Epikouri song)
"Autostop" (Patty Pravo song)